of Japan, was the 4th head of the Kitashirakawa-no-miya collateral branch of the Japanese imperial family and a career officer in the Imperial Japanese Army.

Early years
Prince Kitashirakawa Nagahisa was the only son of Prince Naruhisa Kitashirakawa and Fusako, Princess Kane. He succeeded as the head of the Kitashirakawa-no-miya house upon his father's unexpected death in an automobile accident in France in 1923.

Marriage and family

On 25 April 1935, Prince Nagahisa married Sachiko Tokugawa, born , died , the daughter of Baron Yoshikuni Tokugawa. Prince and Princess Kitashirakawa Nagahisa had one son and one daughter: 

, married Duke Shimazu

Military career
Prince Nagahisa graduated from the 43rd class of the Imperial Japanese Army Academy in 1931, and was commissioned a sub-lieutenant in field artillery. He was promoted to lieutenant in 1936 and captain in 1939 after his graduation from the 52nd class of the Army Staff College. After the start of the Second Sino-Japanese War, the Prince was assigned to the North China Area Army. However, on 14 September 1940, Captain Prince Kitashirakawa died in an airplane crash while on duty in Mengjiang, thus becoming the first member of the Imperial Family killed in World War II .

The Prince received a posthumous promotion to major and the Grand Cordon of the Order of the Chrysanthemum.

Subsequent history
Prince Nagahisa's widow, Princess Sachiko became a commoner in 1947 with the abolition of the collateral branches of the Japanese imperial family during the American occupation of Japan. She became a professor at Ochanomizu University, and in 1969 entered the service of the Imperial Household Agency. She served for many years as the chief of the ladies-in-waiting to Empress Kōjun.

The site of the Kitashirakawa palace in Tokyo is now the Shin-Takanawa Prince Hotel.

References
 Dupuy, Trevor N. The Harper Encyclopedia of Military Biography. New York: HarperCollins Publishers Inc., 1992. 
 Fujitani,T. Splendid Monarchy: Power and Pageantry in Modern Japan. University of California Press; Reprint edition (1998). 
 Lebra, Sugiyama Takie. Above the Clouds: Status Culture of the Modern Japanese Nobility. University of California Press (1995). 

1910 births
1940 deaths
Kitashirakawa-no-miya
Japanese princes
Japanese military personnel killed in action
Victims of aviation accidents or incidents in China
Imperial Japanese Army officers
People from Tokyo